Alf E. Jakobsen (born 11 January 1952 in Lenvik) is a Norwegian Labour politician.

Jakobsen served as the deputy representative to the Norwegian Parliament from Finnmark during the terms 1989–1993, 2001–2005 and 2005–2009. During the first two terms he met as a regular representative for a period meanwhile Oddrunn Pettersen and Karl Eirik Schjøtt-Pedersen respectively were appointed to the Cabinet. In December 2006 Karl Eirik Schjøtt-Pedersen was appointed to work at the Prime Minister's office, and Jakobsen became a regular representative for the third time.

Jakobsen held various positions in Hammerfest municipality council from 1975 to 1987, and then served as mayor from 1999 to 2007. After ending his term in parliament in 2009 Jakobsen once again became mayor in Hammerfest. The Labour Party retained their majority in Hammerfest in the 2011 elections, and Jacobsen continued as mayor.

References

External links

1952 births
Living people
People from Lenvik
People from Hammerfest
Labour Party (Norway) politicians
Members of the Storting
Mayors of Hammerfest
21st-century Norwegian politicians
20th-century Norwegian politicians